Iranian frigate Sahand was a British-made Vosper Mark V class frigate (also known as the ) commissioned as part of a four-ship order. The ship was originally called Faramarz, named after a character in Ferdowsi's Shahnameh. After the 1979 Islamic Revolution it was renamed Sahand, after the Sahand volcano.

Construction
On 10 May 1970, she was damaged by fire while fitting out.

Service history

The Iranian Navy ship was sunk in Operation Praying Mantis on 18 April 1988. A pair of Rockeye cluster bombs from the aircraft and a single Harpoon from the destroyer  finished the destruction of the ship.

Iran has commissioned a  named Sahand in memory of the original Sahand.

See also

 List of ships sunk by missiles
 List of Imperial Iranian Navy vessels in 1979

Notes

References

 

Alvand-class frigates
Ships built in Southampton
1969 ships
Shipwrecks in the Persian Gulf
Maritime incidents in 1988
Ships sunk by US aircraft
Frigates sunk by aircraft
Iran–Iraq War naval ships of Iran
Naval magazine explosions